"Iron Lion Zion" is a song written and recorded in April 1973 or 1974 by Jamaican singer and songwriter Bob Marley. It was first released posthumously on 7 September 1992 on the Songs of Freedom box set, reaching number five in the UK Singles Chart. The single also peaked within the top 10 in Belgium, Finland, France, Ireland, the Netherlands, Spain, Sweden, and Switzerland. On the Eurochart Hot 100, "Iron Lion Zion" peaked at number eight. Outside Europe, it reached number two in New Zealand, number 71 in Australia and number 11 on the US Billboard Modern Rock Tracks chart. A remixed version was released as a single and later included in 1995 on Natural Mystic: The Legend Lives On.

Lyrics
The song's lyrics are directly related to Rastafarian beliefs. Zion, "the promised land" in the song, is referring to Ethiopia. The lion refers to the Lion of Judah, which appeared on the old royal Ethiopian flag, and represents Haile Selassie - the former Ethiopian emperor, whom Rastafarians regard as their Messiah.

Critical reception
Larry Flick from Billboard wrote, "Rockers' reggae with pop swing and dance sizzle, this propulsive, previously unreleased jewel from the new Songs of Freedom boxed set features a wonderfully exultant vocal from Marley, plus the terrific horn of Courtney Pine. A smash in the U.K., it deserves to explode here." Randy Clark of Cash Box felt the cut "is both club- and radio-friendly". Melody Maker praised the song, writing, "...I must say that Marley's "Iron Lion Zion" is a work of god-like genius; every second as noble as the title suggests." 

A reviewer from Music & Media said, "Of course it's a little bit reworked in the studios with additional musicians such as the jazz saxophonist Courtney Pine and female vocal trio I Trees, featuring Marley's widow Rita. Bound to be a classic like the posthumously released "Buffalo Soldier" in 1983." Alan Jones from Music Week named it Pick of the Week and declared it as a "Marley masterpiece", and "a hugely commercial, lightly dubbed and joyous reminder of his talent". New Musical Express wrote, "Cleverly completed and a probable hit, still carrying all the broad-sweep magnitude of his vision." The reviewer added, "I like it. It's top. Will that do?" J.D. Considine for Rolling Stone viewed it as "fiery". Eric Snider from the Tampa Bay Times described it as "infectious".

Track listings
 7" single
"Iron Lion Zion" – 3:21
"Smile Jamaica" (by Bob Marley & the Wailers) – 3:13

 CD maxi
"Iron Lion Zion" (7" mix) – 3:21
"Smile Jamaica" (by Bob Marley & the Wailers) – 3:12
"Three Little Birds" (alternative mix) (by Bob Marley & the Wailers) – 2:55
"Iron Lion Zion" (12" mix) – 7:02

Charts

Weekly charts

Year-end charts

Certifications

References

Sources

1973 songs
1992 singles
Bob Marley songs
Songs written by Bob Marley
Songs about Haile Selassie
Anti-fascist music